Vlado Petković (born January 6, 1983, in Kraljevo) is a Serbian volleyball player. He plays as setter. He is currently playing for Crvena zvezda.  He played for the national team at the 2008 Summer Olympics in Beijing and 2012 Summer Olympics in London.

Career
2002–05  OK Crvena zvezda (Volleyball League of Serbia)
2005–09  OK Vojvodina 
2009–10  Woori Capital Dream Six (South Korea Volleyball V-League)
2010–11  ACH Volley Bled (Slovenia Volleyball League)
2011–12  Energy Resources San Giustino (Italian Volleyball League)
2012–13  Kalleh Mazandaran (Iranian Volleyball Super League)
2013–14  Shahrdari Urmia
2015  Mizan Khorasan
2015-2016  Şahinbey Belediyespor (Turkish Men's Volleyball League)
2016-2017  PAOK VC
2017-2018  Speedball Cheikh
2018–      OK Crvena zvezda (Volleyball League of Serbia)

References
 at sports-reference.com
BBC sports
FIVB profile

1983 births
Living people
Sportspeople from Kraljevo
Serbian men's volleyball players
Olympic volleyball players of Serbia
Volleyball players at the 2008 Summer Olympics
Volleyball players at the 2012 Summer Olympics
European champions for Serbia
PAOK V.C. players
Serbian expatriate sportspeople in South Korea
Serbian expatriate sportspeople in Slovenia
Serbian expatriate sportspeople in Italy
Serbian expatriate sportspeople in Iran
Serbian expatriate sportspeople in Turkey
Serbian expatriate sportspeople in Greece
Mediterranean Games bronze medalists for Serbia
Competitors at the 2005 Mediterranean Games
Mediterranean Games medalists in volleyball